Min Jin-woong (born August 22, 1986) is a South Korean actor. He starred in TV series such as Yong-pal (2015) and Drinking Solo (2016) and Memories of the Alhambra . Min gained popularity through his role in KBS'  weekend family drama Father is Strange (2017).

Filmography

Film

Television series

Theater

Awards and nominations

References

External links

1988 births
Living people
21st-century South Korean male actors
South Korean male television actors
South Korean male film actors
South Korean male stage actors
Korea National University of Arts alumni